Lorenzo Cantarello (March 28, 1932 – January 26, 2013) was an Italian sprint canoer who competed in the early 1960s. He finished ninth the K-2 1000 m event at the 1960 Summer Olympics in Rome. He was a brother of Vasco Cantarello.

References

Lorenzo Cantarello's profile at Sports Reference.com
Lorenzo Cantarello's obituary 

1932 births
2013 deaths
Canoeists at the 1960 Summer Olympics
Italian male canoeists
Olympic canoeists of Italy